Anna Próchniak (born 22 December 1988) is a Polish actress who initially trained as a dancer until deciding to switch to theatre, graduating from the National Film School in Łódź. Próchniak's first major international film role was in  The Innocents  (Sundance Film Festival 2016) directed by Anne Fontaine. Her credits include Polish Warsaw 44 (2014), Northern Irish Bad Day for the Cut (Sundance Film Festival 2017), Latvian Oleg (Directors’ Fortnight section of the Festival de Cannes 2019) and Baptiste for BBC One (2019). Anna is a member of the European Film Academy (EFA).

Selected filmography

References

External links
 

1988 births
Living people
Polish film actresses